Calamity Jane is a Lucky Luke comic written by Goscinny and illustrated by Morris. It was originally published in French by Dupuis in 1967. English editions of this French series have been published by Dargaud, and Cinebook in 2007.

Plot
While taking a wash in a river, Luke is attacked by some Apaches. Gunshots scare the attackers away, and when Luke meets his mysterious savior, it turns out to be none other than the legendary Calamity Jane. After telling Luke her life's story (which ends at this point with the death of her husband, Wild Bill Hickok), she relates that she has recently struck gold and is now ready to settle down again. Despite being slightly unnerved by her rugged, man-like manners, Luke invites her to accompany him to the town of El Plomo to investigate illegal arms trafficking to the local Apaches.

In El Plomo, Luke and Jane encounter August Oyster, owner of the local saloon, whom Jane challenges to an arm-wrestling match for her gold and his saloon. After Oyster's henchman and stand-in Baby Sam loses the match, Janes proceeds to convert the saloon into a place where the local women can also convene. Meanwhile, it is revealed that Oyster is the arms trafficker and his saloon served as a storage and transshipment place for his weapon deliveries. He tasks Baby Sam with driving Jane out of the saloon; after the latter fails twice, Oyster rallies the local Ladies' Guild against Jane. After convincing the ladies that Jane can be a respectful lady herself, Luke goes to great lengths to achieve this, even hiring an etiquette coach for the task.

While Jane undergoes ladyship training (and in turn converts her instructor to her rough ways), Luke follows a clue he found in the saloon's cellar to a nearby lead mine (from which the town has derived its name), and there discovers a stash of weapons and a secret tunnel to the saloon. He ambushes and captures Oyster and Baby Sam when they attempt to retrieve the weapons, but this pushes the patience of Oyster's business partner, Apache chief Gomino. As a result, the Apaches attack the town, but are driven away by Luke and Jane, winning the Ladies' Guild's respect. However, upon realizing that it is adventure she is living for, Jane decides to give up the quiet life and leaves the town after sharing a respectful farewell with Luke.

Characters 
 Calamity Jane: (1852–1903), adventurer during the conquest of the West.
 August Oyster: Owner of the saloon before Calamity Jane arrives at El Plomo and takes possession of it, and a caricature of Sean Connery.
Baby Sam: Oyster's strong but dim-witted henchman.
 Robert Gainsborough: Calamity Jane's teacher of good manners, resembles David Niven.
Chief Gomino: Oyster's trade partner and recipient of the latter's arms deals. His name is an obvious abbreviation of the name Geronimo.
The El Plome Ladies' Guild (Société des dames de El Plomo): A society of conservative local ladies.

Notes
The story's epilogue makes mention of other famous women of the Wild West, including Poker Alice, Madame Moustache, Big Nose Kate, Pickhandle Nan, Rowdy Kate and Kitty the Schemer.

References

 Morris publications in Spirou BDoubliées

External links
Lucky Luke official site album index 
Goscinny website on Lucky Luke

Comics by Morris (cartoonist)
Lucky Luke albums
1967 graphic novels
Works by René Goscinny
Cultural depictions of Calamity Jane
Comics based on real people